Kate Muir is a Scottish writer and documentary maker. Her book, Everything You Need to Know About the Menopause (But Were Too Afraid to Ask) was published in 2022, and she is the creator and producer of two documentaries on the menopause including Davina McCall: Sex, Myths and the Menopause for Channel 4 current affairs. She was chief film critic of The Times for seven years, and is the author of three novels. She is an activist for The Menopause Charity.

Early life
Muir grew up in Dalmuir, West Dunbartonshire, and attended Westbourne School in Glasgow. At the University of Glasgow, she graduated with an LLB in Jurisprudence and Politics, and later completed a postgraduate journalism diploma at Cardiff University.

Career
Muir's first job was on the Ealing Guardian, and then she worked as a reporter for two start-up newspapers: News on Sunday in Manchester and The Sunday Correspondent in London, before arriving at The Times in 1990 as a weekly interviewer. She was posted to New York in 1992, then Paris in 1995, then Washington D.C. in 1999 as a foreign features writer for The Times. In Paris, she began a weekly personal column in The Times Magazine which continued for 11 years.

In 2010, Muir became the chief film critic of The Times, covering reviews and film festivals. At a Cannes press conference in 2011 her question regarding Nazi aesthetics resulted in a huge faux pas for Danish director Lars von Trier and his subsequent ban as persona non grata from the film festival. During her time as a critic, Muir became a campaigner for Women and Hollywood, which advocates for equality and diversity in Hollywood and the wider movie industry. She also works with Time's Up UK and Birds' Eye View, a charity which promotes the distribution of female-led films. Muir left The Times in 2017 to work as a writer and filmmaker.

Muir has written three novels: West Coast, Left Bank and Suffragette City, and the non-fiction books, The Insider's Guide to Paris and Arms and the Woman, about the battle for female equality in the military. Everything You Need To Know About the Menopause... (Simon and Schuster) was published in January 2022, and she is producing a documentary on contraception with Finestripe productions in Glasgow for Channel 4. Her next book will explore the pill and contraception.

Personal life
Muir has three children and lives with her partner Cameron Scott in London. She was previously married to author Ben Macintyre.

Publications
 Everything You Need to Know About the Menopause (but were too afraid to ask), Simon and Schuster, 20 January 2022, 
 West Coast, Headline Review, 4 September 2008, 
 Left Bank, Headline Review, 2 January 2006,  (released as a paperback on 25 September 2006)
 Suffragette City, Macmillan, 9 July 1999, 
Arms and the Woman, 27 April 1992, Sinclair-Stevenson Ltd,   
The Insider's Guide to Paris, Robson Books, 5 July 1999,

References

External links
 The Times
 Scotsman June 2008
 Twitter
 Scottish food in 2008
 
 

Alumni of Cardiff University
Alumni of the University of Glasgow
Scottish columnists
Scottish film critics
People from Hampstead
People from Clydebank
Scottish women novelists
The Times people
Living people
Scottish women columnists
Scottish women critics
British women film critics
Year of birth missing (living people)
People educated at Westbourne School for Girls